Trazegnies is a town of Wallonia and a district of the municipality of Courcelles, located in the province of Hainaut, Belgium. 

Having merged with the municipality in 1976, it is located halfway between Charleroi and La Louvière. A former mining area, it is the location of Trazegnies Castle.

Trazegnies gives its name to the Marquess of Trazegnies d'Ittre.

External links
 

Former municipalities of Hainaut (province)
Belgium geography articles needing translation from French Wikipedia